Rožmberk may mean:

Rožmberk Castle, in the South Bohemian Region of the Czech Republic (Český Krumlov District)
Rožmberk nad Vltavou, a village  nearby the castle
Rožmberk Pond, a large fish pond (489 ha) in South Bohemian Region of the Czech Republic (Jindřichův Hradec District)
House of Rožmberk, a medieval aristocratic family from Bohemia

See also
Rosenberg, German variant